The Pager River is a river of Uganda in eastern Africa. It flows through the northern part of the country and joins the Achwa River.

Rivers of Uganda